Beale GAA is a Gaelic football club based in the town of Ballybunion, County Kerry, Ireland. Founded in 1972, the club fields teams in competitions organised by the North Kerry Football Board. Beale won the North Kerry Senior Football Championship in 2014. Sand in our Boots, a book published in October 2016 and recording the history of Beale GAA club, won the GAA's 2016 MacNamee Award for 'best GAA club publication'.

Honours
 North Kerry Senior Football Championship (8): 1977, 1978, 1979, 1981, 1982, 1984, 1989, 2014
 Kerry Intermediate Football Championship (1): 1984
 Kerry Novice Football Championship (2): 1977, 2005

Notable players
Former or current inter-county players who have played for the Beale senior team include:
 Eoin 'Bomber' Liston
 Denis 'Ogie' Moran

References

Gaelic football clubs in County Kerry
Gaelic games clubs in County Kerry